Mount Pleasant/Scottdale Airport  is a privately owned, public use airport in Fayette County, Pennsylvania, United States. It is located three nautical miles (6 km) south of the central business district of Mount Pleasant and near Scottdale, both boroughs in Westmoreland County.

This airport was included in the National Plan of Integrated Airport Systems for 2009–2013, which categorized it as a general aviation facility.

Facilities and aircraft 
Mount Pleasant/Scottdale Airport covers an area of 54 acres (22 ha) at an elevation of 1,160 feet (354 m) above mean sea level. It has two runways with turf surfaces: 6/24 is 2,188 by 161 feet (667 x 49 m) and 14/32 is 1,600 by 220 feet (488 x 67 m).

For the 12-month period ending October 29, 2010, the airport had 900 general aviation aircraft operations, an average of 75 per month. At that time there were 14 aircraft based at this airport: 93% single-engine and 7% ultralight.

References

External links 
 Mt. Pleasant-Scottdale Airport (P45) at Pennsylvania DOT Bureau of Aviation
 Aerial image as of April 1994 from USGS The National Map

Airports in Pennsylvania
Transportation buildings and structures in Fayette County, Pennsylvania